Acicula is a genus of very small land snails with an operculum, terrestrial gastropod mollusks in the family Aciculidae.

Species
Species within the genus Acicula include:
 Acicula algerensis
 Acicula beneckei
 Acicula benoiti
 Acicula corcyrensis
 † Acicula crassistoma Stworzewicz & Sołtys, 1996 
 Acicula disjuncta
 Acicula douctouyrensis
 † Acicula edlaueri Schlickum, 1970 
 † Acicula filifera Sandberger, 1862 
 † Acicula flachi (Clessin, 1911) 
 Acicula fusca (Montagu, 1803)
  † Acicula giuntellii Harzhauser, Neubauer & Esu in Harzhauser et al., 2015
 Acicula hausdorfi
 † Acicula isselii (Flach, 1889) 
  † Acicula kadolskyi Manganelli, Cianfanelli, Barbato & Benocci, 2014
 Acicula lallemanti
 Acicula letourneuxi
 † Acicula limbata Reuss, 1861 
 Acicula lineata (Draparnaud, 1801) - type species
 Acicula lineolata
 † Acicula michaudiana Schlickum, 1975 
 Acicula moussoni
 Acicula multilineata
 † Acicula nanobelone Kadolsky, 2008 
 Acicula norrisi
 Acicula palaestinensis
 Acicula parcelineata
 Acicula (Acicula) persica Subai, 1981
 † Acicula praediezi Kadolsky, 2008
 † Acicula pseudosturanii Kadolsky, 2008
 Acicula riedeli
 † Acicula schlickumi (Schütt, 1967) 
 Acicula szigethyannae
 † Acicula sturanii Schlickum & Strauch, 1979
 Acicula vezzanii
Species brought into synonymy
 † Acicula irenae Schlickum, 1978 : synonym of † Acicula edlaueri Schlickum, 1970

References

External links

Guido Poppe: Acicula